"Bump, Bump, Bump" is a song by American boy band B2K, featuring P. Diddy. It was released October 2002 as the lead single from B2K's second album Pandemonium!. It was written by R. Kelly and Varick Smith and produced by Kelly. It became B2K's first top 10 hit on the Billboard Hot 100 singles chart, and reached number one for one week starting on February 1, 2003.

Formats and track listings
CD single
 "Bump, Bump, Bump" (radio edit) – 3:56
 "Bump, Bump, Bump" (Jiggy Joint radio remix) – 3:53

12" maxi
 "Bump, Bump, Bump" (main version) – 4:47
 "Bump, Bump, Bump" (radio edit) – 
 "Bump, Bump, Bump" (instrumental) – 4:47
 "Bump, Bump, Bump" (a cappella) – 4:46

12"  maxi – Remixes – Promo
 "Bump, Bump, Bump" (club mix) – 6:27
 "Bump, Bump, Bump" (bonus beats) – 3:53
 "Bump, Bump, Bump" (radio edit) – 3:39
 "Bump, Bump, Bump" (percapella) – 3:53

Remixes
 Bump, Bump, Bump (Official Remix)
 Bump, Bump, Bump (Remix) (feat. DJ Whoo Kidd & 50 Cent)
 Bump, Bump, Bump (DJ Static Remix) (feat. Jay-Z & 50 Cent)
 Dunk, Dunk, Dunk (by Ne-Yo)

Personnel
 R. Kelly – Composer, producer, vocal producer, arranger, co-mixing, background vocals
 Varick Smith – Additional composing
 Max Gousse – Vocal producer, executive producer
  Troy Taylor – Vocal producer
 Sean "P. Diddy" Combs – Guest vocals, vocal producer, mixing
 Donnie Lyle – Guitars
 Abel Garibaldi – Recording, programming
 Jason Mlodzinski – Programming assistant
 Ian Mereness, Andy Gallas, Rony Nameri, Orlando Calzado – Recording
 Rob Paustain, Robert Williams – Additional recording
 Mike Patterson – Mixing
 Chris Athens – Mastering
 Chris Stokes, David McPherson, Ketrina Askew, B2K, Platinum Status – Executive
Producer
 Marvin Peart – Associate executive producer
 Jiggy Join – Remix producer

Music video
The video was released in November 2002 and was directed by Chris Stokes and Erik White. It features the band and P. Diddy in colorful rooms with dancers.

Charts

Weekly charts

Year-end charts

Certifications

References

Billboard Hot 100 number-one singles
R. Kelly songs
Songs written by R. Kelly
Song recordings produced by R. Kelly
B2K songs
2002 singles
2002 songs
Song recordings produced by Troy Taylor (record producer)